Mohamed Mohamed Haythem El Maghrabi (born 28 April 2001) is an Egyptian professional footballer who plays as a defender for Smouha on loan from Al Ahly.

Club career
El Maghrabi's first taste of professional football came in January 2022, when he made his debut in the EFA League Cup against El Gouna. In February of the same year, he was named in the Al Ahly squad ahead of the 2021 FIFA Club World Cup. He would go on to make one appearance, starting in Al Ahly's opening 1–0 win over Mexican side Monterrey. He suffered an injury during the game, which ruled him out of the semi-final game against Brazilian side Palmeiras.

Later in February, El Maghrabi was sent on a two and a half season long loan to Czech side Teplice, alongside teammate Mohamed Yasser. The move was criticised by journalist Ahmed Schubert, who said that El Maghrabi would struggle against fully professional players in the Czech Republic. El Maghrabi himself said that he was happy with the move.

After nine appearances and a goal for Teplice's 'B' team in the Bohemian Football League, El Maghrabi made his debut for the club's first team, playing 90 minutes in a 2–0 Czech First League loss to Pardubice on 14 May 2022.

Career statistics

Club

Notes

Honours
Al Ahly
FIFA Club World Cup: Third-Place 2021

References

2001 births
Living people
Egyptian footballers
Egypt youth international footballers
Association football defenders
Bohemian Football League players
Czech First League players
Al Ahly SC players
FK Teplice players
Egyptian expatriate footballers
Egyptian expatriate sportspeople in the Czech Republic
Expatriate footballers in the Czech Republic